Events from the year 1892 in Sweden

Incumbents
 Monarch – Oscar II
 Prime Minister – Erik Gustaf Boström.

Events

 Cision
 Örebro Mission
 Swedish Cooperage Union
 11 June - Stockholm Public Women's Club is founded in Stockholm.

Births

 2 July – Anders Larsson, sport wrestler (died 1945).
 10 July – Augusta Björkenstam, countess and businessperson (died 1892)  
 23 July – Erik Adlerz, diver (died 1975).
 15 August – Gösta Lundqvist, sailor (died 1944).
 4 December – Per Bertilsson, gymnast (died 1972).

Deaths

 7 January - Maria Cederschiöld (deaconess) (born 1815)
 Carolina Lindström, hat maker (born 1812)
 11 December - Nancy Edberg, pioneer swimmer (born 1832)
 25 January - Charlotta Norberg, ballerina (born 1824)
 21 October - Anne Charlotte Leffler, writer (born 1849)
 Matilda Kristina von Schwerin, landowner  (born 1818)

See also

References

 
Years of the 19th century in Sweden